Altererythrobacter deserti is a Gram-negative, aerobic, short-rod-shaped and non-motile bacterium from the genus of Altererythrobacter which has been isolated from desert soil.

References

External links
Type strain of Altererythrobacter deserti at BacDive -  the Bacterial Diversity Metadatabase

Sphingomonadales
Bacteria described in 2017